The 6th Target is the sixth book in the Women's Murder Club series featuring Lindsay Boxer by author James Patterson with Maxine Paetro.  It was released on May 8, 2007.

Plot summary
When a horrifying attack leaves one of the four members of the Women's Murder Club struggling for her life, the others fight to keep a madman behind bars before anyone else is hurt. Lindsay Boxer and her new partner in the San Francisco police department run flat-out to stop a series of kidnappings that has electrified the city: children of rich families are being plucked off the streets together with their nannies - but the kidnappers aren't demanding ransom. Amid uncertainty and rising panic, Lindsay juggles the possibility of a new love with an unsolvable investigation, and the knowledge that one member of the club could be on the brink of death.

Just when everything appears momentarily under control, the case takes a terrifying turn, putting an entire city in danger. Lindsay must make a choice she never dreamed she'd face—with no certainty that either outcome has more than a prayer of success, a decision she has never made before. One that will change her life, as parents everywhere expect the worst, as new assistant D.A Yuki Castellano prepares to prosecute a high-profile trial. Detective Lindsay Boxer pursues one lead after another to capture the murderer who tried to kill her friend. However, the clues do not seem to ease the solving of the crime.

Lindsay Boxer has to solve three separate mysteries in this novel.

On a ferry, a madman named Alfred Brinkley shoots people and hurts Claire Washburn, SF's ME and Boxer's friend. Ike Quintana, an addict, voluntary points the police to Alfred Brinkley, a madman who hears voices in his head; while Boxer is wondering how to contact him, he spontaneously turns himself to Lindsay herself, going to her house. She arrests him and puts him on trial.
Brinkley is defended by Mickey Sherman, an excellent lawyer who has to fight the People, represented by Yuki Castellano, together with Lindsay and Claire one of the member of the Women's Murder Club.
Sherman convinces the jury Brinkley's legally insane and so he's judged not guilty and simply interned into a criminal asylum.
Some days after the verdict, though, Brinkley kills his warden and escapes.
He goes to meet her mother, who reminds of having killing his sister when he was a boy; Brinkley gets violent again and attempts to kill her. Boxer catches him and finally manages to convict; only to hear Brinkley still threatening her while moved to prison.

A parallel plot deals with a band of pedophiles, led by Paul Renfree, a man who was molested when a boy and now, with the help of his wife, kidnaps young guys with the intent of selling them to the child trafficking mafia; when he tries to kill Madison Tyler, SFPD tails him until they get their identity and manage to stop him and his accessories.

Release details
2007, USA, Little Brown , 8 May 2007, Hardback

Reference: http://www.jamespatterson.com/books_6thTarget.php#book

2007 American novels
Women's Murder Club (novel series)
Little, Brown and Company books
Collaborative novels